Club Deportivo Verdún was a Honduran football club.

History
The club competed in the Liga Nacional de Fútbol de Honduras during the 1971–72 season, after it purchased the franchise of Atlético Español. A year later they sold their franchise to Broncos who were later sold to Universidad to become Broncos UNAH and later just Universidad.

Achievements
Segunda División
Winners (1): 1969–70

References

Defunct football clubs in Honduras
Association football clubs established in 1971